The Landai Sin Valley, or the Bashgal Valley, is a geographical feature of Nuristan Province, eastern Afghanistan, formed by the Landai Sin River which empties into the Kunar River (also called the Chitral River) at Barikot, Kamdesh District in Nuristan, Afghanistan. The largest town in the valley is Kamdesh. The lower Bashgal Valley is inhabited by the Kom people.

History
During the period of British influence in the 19th century, the Landai Sin Valley was considered part of Chitral State.

In the 1980s, Salafist cleric Mawlawi Afzal founded the Islamic Revolutionary State of Afghanistan in Landai Sin, which established consulates in Saudi Arabia and Pakistan.

References

Landforms of Nuristan Province
Valleys of Afghanistan